Kline Biology Tower is a skyscraper in New Haven, Connecticut. The building is home to the Yale University Department of Biology and is currently the tallest building on the Yale campus and the  fourth-tallest building in New Haven. It was the tallest building in the city from 1966 to 1969, and was designed by Philip Johnson, who also designed the nearby—and architecturally related—Kline Geology and Chemistry Laboratories.

References

Yale University buildings
Buildings and structures completed in 1966
Skyscrapers in Connecticut
Skyscrapers in New Haven, Connecticut
Modernist architecture in Connecticut
Brutalist architecture in Connecticut
University and college academic buildings in the United States